Fatsia japonica, also fatsi, paperplant, false castor oil plant, or Japanese aralia, is a species of flowering plant in the family Araliaceae, native to southern Japan and southern Korea.

Etymology
The name fatsi is an approximation of the Japanese word for 'eight' (hachi in modern romanization), referring to the eight leaf lobes. The name "Japanese aralia" is due to the genus being classified in the related genus Aralia in the past. It has been interbred with Hedera helix (common ivy) to produce the intergeneric hybrid × Fatshedera lizei.

Description
The flowers are small, white, borne in dense terminal compound umbels in late autumn or early winter, followed by small black fruit in spring.

Cultivation
It is commonly grown as an ornamental plant in warm temperate regions where winters do not fall below about −15 °C (5 °F). F. japonica thrives in semi-shade to full-shade and is winter hardy in USDA Zones 8–10. It can be grown as an indoor plant and has been shown to effectively remove gaseous formaldehyde from indoor air.

This plant and its cultivar F. japonica 'Variegata' have gained the Royal Horticultural Society's Award of Garden Merit.

An ornamental plant, F. japonica 'Spider's Web' (or 'Spider White') is a rare cultivar with variegated leaves. The dark-green leaves are strongly white-flecked, particularly at the edges, though the white variegation may occasionally disperse across the whole leaf. The variegation may change with the seasons and as the plant ages. Terminal clumps of white flowers emerge in autumn, which are followed by black berries.

Naturalisation
While grown as a landscaping plant, it has also become naturalised in some areas. In New Zealand, it has become established in waste areas and abandoned gardens, spreading by suckers and prolific self seeding.

Health
The sap, which is sticky and resinous, can cause contact dermatitis in sensitive people.

Gallery

References

Further reading

Huxley, A., ed. (1992). New RHS Dictionary of Gardening. Macmillan.
Fatsia japonica, BBC Gardening
Poplay, I. et al. (2010). An illustrated Guide to Common Weeds Of New Zealand. 3rd ed. Pg. 36

japonica
Flora of Japan
Garden plants
House plants
Taxa named by Jules Émile Planchon